Doc Holliday was a gambler and gunfighter of the American Old West.

Doc Holliday may also refer to:

Doc Holliday (American football) (born 1957), American football coach
Doc Holliday (announcer), radio personality
Roy Halladay (1977–2017), Major League Baseball pitcher
Doc Holliday (band), a southern US rock band
Doc Holliday, song from the album Outlaw Gentlemen & Shady Ladies (2013) by Volbeat

Holliday, Doc